Acropora austera  is a species of Acropora coral found in the Indo-Pacific. A. austera are fast-growing that are dispersed in ocean currents.

References

External links
 
 

Acropora